The Cyklokros Tábor is a cyclo-cross race held in Tábor, Czech Republic, which is part of the UCI Cyclo-cross World Cup.

Past winners

Men

Women

References
 Results

UCI Cyclo-cross World Cup
Cycle races in the Czech Republic
Cyclo-cross races
Recurring sporting events established in 1996
1996 establishments in the Czech Republic